The Oklahoma State Budget for Fiscal Year 2013, is a spending request by Governor Mary Fallin to fund government operations for July 1, 2012–June 30, 2013. Governor Fallin proposed the budget on February 6, 2012. This was Governor Fallin's second budget submitted as governor.

The Oklahoma Legislature approved the budget on May 25, 2012, and Governor Fallin signed the budget into law on May 29, 2012.

History
On February 6, 2012, Republican Governor of Oklahoma Mary Fallin proposed her $6.6 billion Executive Budget for Fiscal Year 2013. In accordance with the Oklahoma Constitution, the budget was balanced. Fallin's FY-2013 budget is flat compared to the 2012 Oklahoma state budget.

Fallin submitted her proposal to the heavily-Republican dominated Oklahoma Legislature. In early May 2012, after months of debate and review by House and Senate budget committees, the Senate and House convened the Joint Committee on Appropriations and Budget to address the FY13 budget. After months of review and debate, late in May 2012, Governor Fallin and the legislative leadership reached a $6.8 billion budget deal, an increase of $200 million over Fallin's original proposed budget. The increase is approximately 3.2% more than the FY-2012 budget.

The Republican dominated Senate passed the budget deal on May 22 by 30-15 vote, exactly along party lines. The Republican dominated House then addressed the budget on May 24. After an initial vote of 47-47 in which 17 House Republicans joined with all 30 House Democrats to vote against the bill. The House Democrats believed the bill did not provide adequate funding to education services while the several House Republicans believed the budget spent too money in total.

After a long recess the House reconvened and passed the budget 52-42, with 12 Republicans voting against the bill. 5 House Republicans who had originally voted against the budget switched their vote to ensure passage of the bill. Not a single Democrat in either the Senate or House voted in favor of the budget. Governor Fallin signed the 2013 budget bill on May 29, 2012.

Governor's Major Issues
In her Budget Message to the Legislature, Governor Fallin identified the following issues are major goals for her Executive Budget.

Tax Reform
Restructure personal income tax structure from seven brackets at top marginal rate of 5.25 to three brackets at top marginal rate of 3.5 
Eliminate $200 million in annual tax credits
Save $300,000 in Oklahoma Tax Commission administrative costs due to tax code restructure
Appropriate $7.9 million to Oklahoma Teachers' Retirement System due to reduced income tax revenues

Government Efficiency
Appropriate $3.5 million to Oklahoma Office of State Finance to create transparent performance evaluation system for State agencies

Energy
Save $300-$500 million over ten years by directing all State agencies and higher education institutions to reduce energy consumption by 20 percent by 2020

Health
Appropriate $1.5 million to Certified Health Schools Reward Program to provide financial rewards to healthy schools
Appropriate $1.7 million to reduce infant mortality
Appropriate $3.1 million to establish 40 new residency slots in five rural hospitals
Appropriate $2.5 million to establish one additional community-based mental illness crisis center
Appropriate $0.5 million to fund mental health screenings in county jails
Appropriate $3.1 million for State match of federal Systems of Care Grant
Hold health and human services agencies harmless from the loss of federal American Recovery and Reinvestment Act funds:
Oklahoma Health Care Authority: $70.8 million
Oklahoma Department of Human Services: $22.6 million
Oklahoma Department of Mental Health and Substance Abuse Services: $4 million
Oklahoma Department of Health: $0.6 million
J.D. McCarty Center: $0.4 million
Oklahoma Office of Juvenile Affairs: $0.3 million
Transfer state matching dollars for behavioral health services from Oklahoma Health Care Authority to Oklahoma Department of Mental Health and Substance Abuse Services, including associated $136 million

Transportation
Appropriate $15 million to Oklahoma Department of Transportation to address failing roads and bridges
Increase cap on State ROADS Fund from $435 million to $550 million, generating an additional $479 million over eight years
Re-appropriate $20 million annually from Oklahoma Department of Transportation to the various counties
Oklahoma Turnpike Authority to increase capacity of Creek Turnpike and Kilpatrick Turnpike

Other Initiatives
Appropriate $5 million to cover debt service associated with bond issue of approximately $50 million to repair and upgrade Oklahoma State Capitol building
Appropriate $6 million to State Emergency Fund to cover future emergencies
Appropriate $2 million to Oklahoma Office of the Chief Medical Examiner in order for agency to regain national accreditation 
Appropriate additional $1 million to Oklahoma Department of Commerce to protect United States military establishments in State
Appropriate $5 million to Quick Action Closing Fund to attract new businesses to State
Appropriate $5 million to Office of the Oklahoma Attorney General to defend State against lawsuits from tribal governments regarding water rights
Save $4.2 million from enacted Oklahoma Office of State Finance consolidations
FY-2012 Supplemental Appropriations:
Department of Education - $37.6 million for flexible benefit allowance
State Emergency Fund - $34.1 million to eliminate backlog of State reimbursements to local government 
Oklahoma Department of Public Safety - $6 million to conduct Oklahoma Highway Patrol Academy to train new State Troopers
Oklahoma Office of the Chief Medical Examiner - $1 million to fund national reaccreditation

Budget Deal
On May 21, 2012, Governor Fallin, President pro tempore of the Oklahoma Senate Brian Bingman, and Speaker of the Oklahoma House of Representatives Kris Steele reached a new budget deal worth $6.8 billion, an increase of $200 million over Fallin's original proposed budget. The additional revenues will come from redirecting agency-collected fees to the State's general fund.

As part of the budget deal, Governor Fallin and the legislative leadership approved the following appropriation issues:
Oklahoma State Department of Education - $52.4 million annualized funding for teacher health benefits and National Board Certified Teacher bonuses
Oklahoma Department of Career and Technology Education - $1.4 million annualized funding for operations, matching an FY 2012 supplemental measure
Oklahoma State Regents for Higher Education - 
$10 million annualized funding for operations, matching an FY 2012 supplemental measure
Transfer $161 million to university endowed chairs programs
$3 million for the Wayman Tisdale specialty health clinic in Tulsa
$3.08 million for the OSU College of Osteopathic Medicine to fund the rural residency program to increase access to health care in rural and underserved areas
Oklahoma Department of Transportation - $99 million increase to repay FY-2012 fund transfer
Oklahoma State Department of Health - $1 million increase for infant mortality initiatives
Oklahoma Health Care Authority - $57 million for low income and disabled citizens
Oklahoma Department of Human Services - 
$25 million to fund DHS reforms
$17 million to replacement of one-time funding in FY-2012
$1.5 million for Advantage Waiver Program to provide reimbursement rate increases for home health care providers that serve the elderly
$1.5 million to provide Developmental Disabilities Services Division reimbursement rate increases
$1 million to reduce the current Developmental Disabilities Services Division waiting list
Oklahoma Department of Mental Health and Substance Abuse Services - 
$5.5 million for additional crisis center to assist those with mental health and/or substance abuse and addiction problems
$667,000 for mental health and substance abuse screenings to determine the risks and needs of each convicted offender
Oklahoma Department of Veterans Affairs - $1 million increase to expand nursing staff and reduce staff/patient ratios
Oklahoma Department of Public Safety - $5 million for Oklahoma Highway Patrol Academy to train new State Troopers
Oklahoma Office of Medicolegal Investigations - $1 million supplemental and $1.5 million annualization of supplemental for personnel, equipment, and infrastructure improvement

Total Spending

Requested
The governor's proposed Executive Budget for 2013 totals $6.6 billion in spending. Figures shown in the spending request do not reflect the actual appropriations for Fiscal Year 2013, which must be authorized by the Legislature. Percentages in parentheses indicate percentage change compared to FY2012 enacted budget. The budget request is broken down by the following expenditures:
Appropriations by Cabinet Department: $6.6 billion (+1.9%)
$3.4 billion - Education (+0%)
$1.2 billion - Health (+0%)
$716 million - Human Services (+0.4%)
$662 million - Safety and Security (+2%)
$207 million - Transportation (+93%)
$87.4 million - Finance and Revenue (+4.2%)
$84.4 million - Judiciary (+0.1%)
$80.3 million - Commerce and Tourism (+0%)
$35.2 million - Agriculture (+0%)
$34.7 million - Veterans Affairs (+0%)
$30.6 million - Legislature (+0%)
$29.0 million - Human Resources and Administration (+20.8%)
$17.8 million - Science and Technology (+0%)
$13.1 million - Environment (+0%)
$12.1 million - Energy (+0%)
$10.2 million - Military (+0%)
$8.4 million - Secretary of State (+0%)
$2.5 million - Governor and Lieutenant Governor (+0%)

Enacted
The Oklahoma Legislature approved total appropriations for fiscal year 2013 of $6.8 billion. Percentages in parentheses indicate percentage change from fiscal year 2012 final appropriations. The final appropriations for Fiscal Year 2013 are broken down by the following expenditures:
Appropriations by Cabinet Department: $6.8 billion (+3.2%)
$3.4 billion - Education (+0%)
$1.3 billion - Health (+8%)
$766 million - Human Services (+7%)
$665 million - Safety and Security (+0%)
$207 million - Transportation (+0%)
$109 million - Finance and Revenue (-7%)
$84.6 million - Judiciary (+0%)
$80.0 million - Commerce and Tourism (+0%)
$37.7 million - Agriculture (+7%)
$35.7 million - Veterans Affairs (+3%)
$32.7 million - Legislature (+7%)
$17.8 million - Science and Technology (+0%)
$14.8 million - Environment (+13%)
$12.1 million - Energy (+13%)
$10.7 million - Military (+5%)
$8.4 million - Secretary of State (+0%)
$2.7 million - Governor and Lieutenant Governor (+8%)
Numbers have been rounded

References

External links
Oklahoma Office of State Finance official website
Fiscal Year 2013 Budget

 
2013 in Oklahoma
Oklahoma